Thérèse-Éléonore Lingée (born Thérèse-Éléonore Hémery 1753- circa 1833), was a French artist and engraver,

Biography 
She was born in Paris, the younger sister of Marguerite Hémery, engraver born in 1745, who married the prolific Nicolas Ponce, and of the engraver Antoine-François Hémery, born in 17511. It is undoubtedly Marguerite who was the first to initiate her into the art of engraving and stippling. She developed a particular talent for the manner pencil drawing, by interpreting Jean-Michel Moreau, André Pujos and Charles-Nicolas Cochin, including many portraits of medallions2. She worked for the collection of the Cabinet de Poullain (1781), published by Basan and Poignant.

She exhibited at the 1781 Paris Salon, with The Abduction of the Sabines after Cochin. Shortly before the French Revolution, she executed a series of engraved portraits of members of the Academic Society of the Children of Apollo after Moreau and Cochin,2 and is mentioned at that time as part of the Academy of Marseille.

Family 
She married the engraver Charles-Louis Lingée (1748-1819), including at least two children; the couple lived in rue Saint-Jacques. She signed her own works with her husband's name, even after her divorce, then married a certain Lefebvre (or Lefèvre); she exhibited with him at the Salon of 1793 under the name of "citizen Lingée, woman Lefèvre". The couple resided at the rue des Lions-Saint-Paul.

She was still active around 1813-1814; one of her last addresses was on rue Mazarine; she participated in the Étienne Achille Réveil collection of the Museum of painting and sculpture. Her date of death varies between 1820 and 1833.

References 

1753 births
Year of death uncertain
French women printmakers
Women engravers
18th-century French engravers
18th-century French women artists
19th-century French engravers
19th-century French women artists
Engravers from Paris